is a former Japanese football player.

His elder brother Daisuke is also a former Japanese footballer.

Club statistics

References

External links

j-league

1987 births
Living people
Fukuoka University alumni
Association football people from Fukuoka Prefecture
Japanese footballers
J1 League players
J2 League players
Vissel Kobe players
Cerezo Osaka players
Roasso Kumamoto players
V-Varen Nagasaki players
Association football forwards